Qahremanluy-e Olya (also Romanized as Qahremānlūy-e ‘Olyā; also known as Qahramānlū, Qahramānlū ‘Olyā, Qahremānlarī-ye ‘Olyā, and Qahremānlū-ye ‘Olyā) is a village in Bash Qaleh Rural District, in the Central District of Urmia County, West Azerbaijan Province, Iran. At the 2006 census, its population was 189, in 58 families.

References 

Populated places in Urmia County